The 1948 Buffalo Bills season was their third in the All-America Football Conference. The team failed to improve on their previous output of 8-4-2, winning only seven games. They qualified for the playoffs for the first time in franchise history, but lost to the Cleveland Browns in the AAFC Championship.

The team's statistical leaders included George Ratterman with 2,577 passing yards, Chet Mutryn with 823 rushing yards and 96 points scored, and Al Baldwin with 916 receiving yards.

Season schedule

Playoffs

Division standings

References

Buffalo Bills (AAFC) seasons
Buffalo Bills
1948 in sports in New York (state)